Cremnophila is a genus of snout moths. It was erected by Ragonot in 1893, and is known from Russia, Siberia, China, Austria, and Switzerland.

Species
 Cremnophila pyraustella Zerny, 1914
 Cremnophila sedakovella (Eversmann, 1851)

References

Phycitini
Pyralidae genera